The 1986 Sicilian regional election took place on 22 June 1986.

Christian Democracy was by far the largest party, largely ahead of the Italian Communist Party. Christian Democrat Rino Nicolosi was President of the Region for the whole legislature, albeit at the head of different coalitions, that included the Italian Socialist Party for most of the time.

Results

Sources: Istituto Cattaneo and Sicilian Regional Assembly

References

Elections in Sicily
1986 elections in Italy
June 1986 events in Europe